Shahkuh-e Sofla (also Romanized as Shāhkūh-e Soflá; also known as Shāh Kūh-e Pā’īn, Shādkūh-e Pā’īn, Shāhkūh Pāīn, and Shār Kūh-e Pā’īn) is a village in Estarabad-e Jonubi Rural District, in the Central District of Gorgan County, Golestan Province, Iran. At the 2006 census, its population was 355, in 112 families.

References 

Populated places in Gorgan County